The North Carolina State Legislative Building was opened in 1963 and is the current meeting place of the North Carolina General Assembly, the state legislature of the U.S. state of North Carolina.

Location
The Legislative building is located in Raleigh, across from the North Carolina Museum of Natural Sciences and Bicentennial Mall and one block north of the state Capitol.

Design and Construction
In 1959 a commission was formed to guide the construction of a new legislative building to replace the North Carolina State Capitol as the home of the legislature since 1840. Architect Edward Durrell Stone was selected to design the building in partnership with North Carolina firm Holloway & Reeves. The building opened in February 1963.

The building and furnishings cost $5.5 million, or $1.24 for each citizen of North Carolina.

Architectural Details

The building contains separate chambers for the North Carolina House of Representatives and North Carolina Senate. Each pair of brass doors that leads to the House and Senate chambers weighs . A  in the rotunda weighs . The building entrance features a  diameter terrazzo mosaic of the Great Seal of the State of North Carolina.

The building is open to the public Monday through Friday. It’s recently been closed to the public on the weekends due to ongoing maintenance.

See also
List of state and territorial capitols in the United States

References

External links 
VisitRaleigh.com

Buildings and structures in Raleigh, North Carolina
North Carolina General Assembly
Edward Durell Stone buildings
Tourist attractions in Raleigh, North Carolina
Government buildings completed in 1963
1963 establishments in North Carolina